Daniel Elahi Galán Riveros (born 18 June 1996 in Bucaramanga) is a Colombian tennis player.
He has reached a career-high ATP singles ranking of No. 67 on 28 November 2022. He is currently the No. 1 Colombian tennis player. He has a career-high ATP doubles ranking of No. 305 achieved on 26 February 2018.

Personal Information
He is part of the Colsanitas team, an organization that supports the best tennis players in Colombia.

Professional career

2015: ATP debut
Galán made his ATP main draw singles debut at the 2015 Claro Open Colombia where he was given a wildcard. He defeated Pere Riba in the first round.

2020: Grand Slam debut and third round at the French Open
Galán gained additional recognition after his 2020 French Open third round match with Novak Djokovic, his best showing at a Grand Slam thus far. He lost in straight sets (6–0, 6–3, 6–2), but his performance earned him new followers.

2021: Masters 1000 debut and third round, Olympics debut 
As a result of his first and best Masters 1000 third round showing thus far at the 2021 Miami Open, he reached a career-high of World No. 110 on 5 April 2021.

Galán qualified to represent Colombia at the 2020 Summer Olympics where he was defeated by World No. 5 and eventual Olympic champion Alexander Zverev in the second round.

2022: Wimbledon & US Open third rounds, first top-5 win, top 100
At the 2022 Córdoba Open he reached his first ATP quarterfinal of the year as a lucky loser where he lost to top seed Diego Schwartzman.

After missing three major events, he returned to the 2022 Wimbledon Championships where he reached the second round for a second consecutive year defeating Dominik Koepfer. He moved to the third round for the first time at this Major after the withdrawal of 17th seed Roberto Bautista Agut due to a positive COVID-19 test.

He reached the top 100 at World No. 99 on 25 July 2022, after a second round showing as a qualifier at the 2022 Hamburg European Open defeating Federico Coria. At the 2022 Croatia Open Umag he defeated 2016 champion Fabio Fognini.

He made his debut at the US Open as a qualifier. In the first round, he upset world No. 5 Stefanos Tsitsipas to advance to the second round, recording his first victory over a Top-5 player and for Colombia since Iván Molina took down then-No. 3 Manuel Orantes in Tehran in 1975. He became only the third player in the last five years to win a set 6–0 against him. Although Tsitsipas saved eight match points, Galán capitalised on his ninth. He defeated Jordan Thompson in the second round in five sets to reach the third round at this Major for the second time in his career. As a result he moved into the top 75 in the rankings.

At the 2022 San Diego Open he reached his second quarterfinal of the season defeating fourth seed Pedro Martinez (tennis) before losing to fifth seed and eventual champion Brandon Nakashima. As a result he moved to the top 70 in the rankings No. 69 on 26 September. 

He achieved an ATP career-high singles ranking of No. 67 on 28 November 2022.

Singles performance timeline

Current through the 2022 Paris Masters.

Challenger and ITF Finals

Singles: 18 (8–10)

Doubles: 3 (2–1)

Record against top 10 players
Galán's record against players who have been ranked in the top 10, with those who are active in boldface. Only ATP Tour main draw matches are considered:

Wins over top 10 players
He has a  record against players who were, at the time the match was played, ranked in the top 10.

*

References

External links

1996 births
Living people
Colombian male tennis players
Tennis players at the 2020 Summer Olympics
Sportspeople from Bogotá
People from Bucaramanga
Olympic tennis players of Colombia
21st-century Colombian people